Florence Trail (September 1, 1854 - April 21, 1944) was an American educator and author. Though she belonged to one of the wealthiest families of Maryland, she believed in the doctrine of self-support and left home to engage in teaching, first in Kentucky and North Carolina, and afterward in New York and Connecticut. On returning from an extended tour of Europe, she published My Journal in Foreign Lands (New York, 1885). This was followed by other volumes, among them: Studies in Criticism (New York, 1888), Under the Second Renaissance (Buffalo, 1894), and A History of Italian Literature. Trail died in 1944.

Early life and education
Florence Trail was born in Frederick, Maryland, September 1, 1854. She was the second daughter of Charles Edward Trail and Ariana McElfresh. Her siblings included, Anna M. Harding, Henry Trail, Bertha Trail, and Charles Bayard Trail. A severe illness at 10 years of age left her with impaired hearing. Her quickness of perception and efforts to divine what others meant to say caused them to forget, or not to realize, that her hearing was not equal to their own. She graduated first in her class in the Frederick Female Seminary, in 1872, having studied mental and moral philosophy, evidences of Christianity, modern history, mythology, rhetoric and composition. The following year, she graduated with highest honors from Mt. Vernon Institute, Baltimore.

Career
After teaching for four years at the Frederick Female Seminary, she left home for a position in Daughters College, Harrodsburg, Kentucky, where she afterwards taught Latin, French, art and music. In Harrodsburg, as well as in Tarboro, North Carolina, where she taught music in 1887 and 1888, and in Miss Hogarth's school, Goshen, New York, where she acted as substitute for some weeks in January, 1890, she made many devoted friends and did superior work as a teacher.

In 1883, she visited Europe, and afterwards published an account of her travels under the title My Journal in Foreign Lands (New York, 1885), which passed through two editions and served as a guide-book. Trail has been a member of the Society to Encourage Studies at Home for 14 years, five as a student of modern history, French literature, Shakespeare and art, and nine as a teacher of ancient history. Her essay on "Prehistoric Greece as we find it in the Poems of Homer " was read before that society at the annual reunion at Miss Ticknor's, in Boston, Massachusetts, in June, 1883.

Trail was an accomplished musician, having studied music in the seminary in Frederick, in the Peabody Conservatory in Baltimore, and in Chickering Hall, New York. She often appeared in concerts with success. Though gifted in many ways, she was best known as a writer. Her best work was, "Studies in Criticism" (New York, 1888). She published over 100 articles in prose and verse, many without signature, in newspapers and magazines. Inheriting a taste for the languages, she was a fine translator and read German, Italian, Latin and French.

Death
She died April 21, 1944.

Selected works

 My journal in foreign lands, 1884
 Studies in criticism, 1888
 Under the second renaissance : a novel, 1894
 A history of Italian literature, Vol. I., 1903
 A history of Italian literature, Vol. II., 1904
 History and democracy; essays in interpretation, 1916
 Meanings of music, 1918
 The scholar's Italy, 1923
 An Italian anthology, 1926
 A memorial of Ariana McElfresh Trail, 1929
 Modern Italian culture, 1931
 Diary of Florence Trail, 1892
 Foreign family life in France in 1891, 1944

References

Attribution

Bibliography

External links
 
 
 
 

1854 births
1944 deaths
19th-century American writers
19th-century American women writers
Writers from Maryland
Educators from Maryland
19th-century American educators
People from Frederick, Maryland
American non-fiction writers
American travel writers
American women travel writers
Wikipedia articles incorporating text from A Woman of the Century
19th-century American women educators